Aquilegia formosa, the crimson columbine, western columbine, or (ambiguously) "red columbine", is a common wildflower native to western North America, from Alaska to Baja California, and eastward to Montana and Wyoming.

Description
Aquilegia formosa is a perennial herb that grows to 20–80 cm in height, averaging around 60 cm. Flowers, which can be seen from April to August (with some variation between regions), are about 5 cm long and red and yellow in color. The sepals and petal spurs are typically a reddish-orange color, attributed to the anthocyanin pigments pelargonidin and cyanidin, and carotenoids. Petal blades are yellow, pigmented by carotenoids. The primary pollinators are hummingbirds, although bees, butterflies, and flies will also visit flowers. Despite several floral adaptations to hummingbird pollination, at ~9,000-10,000 feet in elevation in the eastern drainages of the central Sierra Nevada mountains of California, A. formosa forms hybrid zones with Aquilegia pubescens, which is primarily pollinated by hawk moths.

The flowers are edible, with a sweet taste—though the seeds can be fatal if eaten, and most parts of the plant contain cyanogenic glycosides.

Distribution
Within its range, the crimson columbine can be found in most kinds of habitat (chaparral, oak woodland, mixed-evergreen or coniferous forest). It is not found on desert floors, nor at altitudes above 3300 metres, and it is absent from the Central Valley of California. It prefers moist locations such as stream banks.

Native American use
Some Plateau Indian tribes used the Aquilegia formosa to concoct a perfume. It is also used medicinally by several Native American tribes.

Etymology
Aquilegia is derived from the Latin word 'aquila', meaning 'eagle', or possibly from the Medieval German words 'Acheleia' or 'Akelei'; this name is in reference to its talon-like nectaries. Formosa means 'handsome', 'beautiful', or 'well-formed'.

References

External links

 Calflora Database: Aquilegia formosa (western columbine, crimson columbine)
  Jepson Manual eFlora (TJM2) treatment of Aquilegia formosa
 UC Photos gallery — Aquilegia formosa

formosa
Flora of the Northwestern United States
Flora of Western Canada
Flora of Alaska
Flora of Baja California
Flora of California
Flora of the Great Basin
Flora of the Rocky Mountains
Flora of the Sierra Nevada (United States)
Natural history of the California chaparral and woodlands
Plants used in traditional Native American medicine
Garden plants of North America
Butterfly food plants
Flora without expected TNC conservation status